Venezuela national cerebral palsy football team is the national cerebral football team for Venezuela that represents the team in international competitions.  At the 2015 IFCPF World Championships, the team finished thirteenth in a fifteen deep field.

Background 
Federacion Venezolana de Deportes para Personas con Paralisis Cerebral (FEVEDE-PC) manages the national team. By 2016, Venezuela had a national championships to support the national team and was active in participating in the IFCPF World Championships.

National team development is supported by an International Federation of Cerebral Palsy Football (IFCPF) recognized national championship.  Recognized years for the national IFCPF recognized competition include 2010, 2011, 2012, 2013, 2014, and 2015.

Players 
There have been a number of players for the Venezuelan squad.

Ranking 
Venezuela was ranked fifteenth in the world by the IFCPF in 2016. The team is also ranked fifth in the Americas in 2016. Venezuela was ranked seventeenth in August 2013 and November 2014. In July 2011 and September 2012, the team was ranked twentieth. In 2014, the team had a goal of trying to improve their ranking to be among the top 16 teams in the world.  They hoped doing so would increase their visibility in the country.

Results 
Venezuela has never participated in a Paralympic Games since the sport made its debut at the 1984 Games. Venezuela has participated in a number of international tournaments. Six teams participated in the Toronto hosted American Cup in 2014. Group A included Venezuela, Argentina and Canada.  Group B included Mexico, Brazil and the United States.  The tournament was important for preparations for the 2015 Parapan American Games, and because it was the last major continental level competition of the year. The team was scheduled to participate in the 2016 IFCPF Qualification Tournament World Championships in Vejen, Denmark in early August.  The tournament was part of the qualifying process for the 2017 IFCPF World Championships.  Other teams scheduled to participate included Scotland, Canada, Portugal, Iran, Northern Ireland, Australia, Japan, Republic of South Korea, Germany, Denmark, and Spain.

In October 2014, the team played a friendly against the country's women's national under-20 side.

IFCPF World Championships 
Venezuela has participated in the IFCPF World Championships.  The team qualified for the 2017 edition based on their performance at the 2016 qualifying event in Denmark.

References 

Cerebral Palsy
Venezuela at the Paralympics
National cerebral palsy football teams